La Poste may refer to:

 Arnac-la-Poste, a commune in France
Jacques Laposte, a French footballer from Martinique
 La Poste Maxi Ketch, a sailing boat build for the Whitbread Round the World Race in 1993

Postal services
 La Poste (France), the postal service of France
 Musée de La Poste, "La Poste Museum"
 SNCF TGV La Poste, postal bullet train used by La Poste
Algérie Poste, the postal service of Algeria
La Poste, the French name for Belgian Post Group
La Poste du Bénin, the postal service of Benin
Postes Canada, the postal service of Canada
La Poste centrafricaine, alternate name of Office national des postes et de l'épargne
La Poste de Côte d'Ivoire, the postal service of Côte d'Ivoire
La Poste gabonaise, the postal service of Gabon
La Poste guinéenne, alternate name of Office de la poste guinéenne
La Poste du Mali, alternate name of Office national des postes du Mali
Poste Maroc, the postal service of Morocco
 La Poste Monaco, the postal service of Monaco
Niger Poste, the postal service of Niger
La Poste, the postal service of Senegal
 La Poste Suisse, the French name for Swiss Post
La Poste, alternate name of Société des postes du Togo
 La Poste Tunisienne, the Tunisian postal service
Poste Vaticane, the postal service of Vatican City

See also
 Post (disambiguation)
 Poste (disambiguation)